The 1932 U.S. Open was the 36th U.S. Open, held June 23–25 at Fresh Meadow Country Club in Flushing, New York, a neighborhood in the north-central part of the  borough of Queens in New York City. Gene Sarazen won his second U.S. Open championship, and the fifth of his seven major titles, ten years after his first U.S. Open win. Earlier in the month, he won the 1932 British Open in England.

Sarazen began with rounds of 74 and 76, which left him five strokes behind co-leaders José Jurado and Philip Perkins. With a three-under-par back-nine in the third round, Sarazen carded an even-par 70 to get within a shot of Perkins after 54 holes. Perkins continued his solid play in the final round, shooting a 70 and a 289 total, while Bobby Cruickshank shot 68 to tie him. They were no match for Sarazen on this day, however, who carded a 66 (−4) to earn a three-stroke victory at 286.

Sarazen set several scoring records on his way to the Open title. His 66 in the final round set a new tournament record, and a champion did not shoot a better final round until Arnold Palmer closed with 65 in 1960. His 286 total tied the tournament record, while his 136 over the final 36 holes set a record that stood until 1983. Sarazen was certainly helped by his familiarity with the venue; he was club pro at Fresh Meadow for five years, from 1925 to 1930.

Four-time major champion Jim Barnes played his final major and finished in 55th place. Johnny Goodman won low-amateur honors at 14th; he went on to win the championship the following year, and remains the last amateur champion.

The course where this U.S. Open was played in Queens no longer exists. Designed by A. W. Tillinghast, it opened in 1923 and also hosted the PGA Championship in 1930, won by Tommy Armour. Under increasing development and tax pressure, the Fresh Meadow Country Club sold the property in 1946, which was developed as a residential neighborhood (the Fresh Meadows section of Queens). The club then purchased the property, clubhouse, and golf course of the defunct Lakeville Golf & Country Club in Lake Success, its current home.

Daily admission for the U.S. Open in 1932 was $2.20, or $5.50 for all three days.

Course layout

Past champions in the field

Made the cut 

Source:

Missed the cut 

Source:

Round summaries

First round
Thursday, June 23, 1932

Source:

Second round
Friday, June 24, 1932

Source:

Third round
Saturday, June 25, 1932 (morning)

Source:

Final round
Saturday, June 25, 1932 (afternoon)

Source:

References

External links
USGA Championship Database
USOpen.com - 1932

U.S. Open (golf)
Golf in New York (state)
Sports in Long Island
Flushing, Queens
U.S. Open
U.S. Open
U.S. Open
U.S. Open